The women's shot put field event at the 1972 Olympic Games took place on September 4 & 7.  Nadezhda Chizhova was very disappointed with her bronze medal finish in 1968 Olympics.  She has won the (1966, 1969 and the 1971) European Athletics Championships.  Since 1968 she has broken the world record six times.  The only threat for the gold medal came from Margitta Gummel the defending Olympic Champion.

Results
All throwers reaching  and the top 12 including ties, advanced to the finals.  All qualifiers are listen in blue.  All distances are listed in metres.

Qualifying

Final

Key:  WR = world record; p = pass; x = fault

References

External links
Official report

Women's shot put
Shot put at the Olympics
1972 in women's athletics
Women's events at the 1972 Summer Olympics